Sparring with Hemingway is a 1995 book written by Budd Schulberg consisting of a collection of his articles on boxing spanning nearly half a century. The book includes descriptions of fights between Rocky Marciano and Archie Moore; Muhammad Ali and George Foreman; Sugar Ray Leonard and Roberto Durán; and Marvelous Marvin Hagler and Thomas Hearns.

Reception
A review of the book in The New York Times praises Schulberg's technical expertise on the subject of boxing. A Chicago Tribune review of the book states:

References

Boxing books
1995 books